Vesna Parun (10 April 1922 – 25 October 2010) was a Croatian poet.

Biography
After schooling in Zlarin, Šibenik, and Split, she studied Romance languages and philosophy at the Faculty of Humanities and Social Sciences, University of Zagreb. From 1947 she was a free artist, writing poetry, essays, criticism, and children's literature. She translated works from Slovene, German, French, and Bulgarian. Her first book of poetry Dawns and Whirlwinds (1947) 'contrasts the youthful vibrancy, love and nature with death and the destructive forces of war'. It received negative reviews from the socialist-realist critics, who saw it as "apolitical" and "decadent", possibly for not conforming to tendencies to ideologize post-World War II poetry.

Starting with the poetry collection Black Olive Tree (1955), love was the primary motif of her written opus. Incessantly working on romantic lyrical poetry, from the 1960s on, she published satiric verses directed at politics and the erotic. She wrote more than 20 works for children alone, the most prominent and widely performed being Mačak Džingiskan i Miki Trasi (1968). She also wrote several drama pieces, including Marija i mornar (1960). She is the first woman in Croatia who earned her money solely by being a writer. She published, printed, and illustrated some of her own books.

Selected works
Parun's other significant works include:
 Vidrama vjerna (1957)
 Patka Zlatka (1957)
 Ti i nikad (1959)
 Konjanik (1961)
 Otvorena vrata (1968)
 Ukleti dažd (1969)
 Stid me je umrijeti (1974)
 Igre pred oluju (1979)
 Šum krila, šum vode (1981)
 Salto mortale (1981)
 Pokraj rijeke Kupe kad se vrapci skupe (1989)
 Nedovršeni mozaik (1990)
 Ptica vremena (1996)
 Smijeh od smrti jači (1997)
 Mozak u torbi (2001)
 More jadransko (2001)
 Noć za pakost: moj život u 40 vreća (2001)
 Da sam brod (2002)
 Suze putuju (2002)

Awards
 1959 – Poet of the Year Award
 1982 – Vladimir Nazor Award for the lifetime achievement
 1995 – Poeta Oliveatus at the "Croatia rediviva: Ča, Kaj, Što – baštinski dani" festival.
 2002 – Visoka žuta žita charter at the Poet Meetings in Drenovci for her overall literary opus and abiding contribution to the Croatian literature
 2003 – Tin Ujević Award, for the collection of sonnets Suze putuju
 2010 – European Award – Knjizevna opstina Vrsac (Literary Municipality of Vrsac)

References
 

1922 births
2010 deaths
People from Šibenik
21st-century Croatian poets
Yugoslav writers
Vladimir Nazor Award winners
Croatian children's writers
Croatian women children's writers
Croatian women poets
Yugoslav poets
20th-century Croatian poets
20th-century Croatian women writers
21st-century Croatian women writers